is a town located in Gunma Prefecture, Japan. , the town had an estimated population of 21,749 in 8311 households, and a population density of 220 persons per km².

Geography
Kanra is located in the southwestern portion of Gunma Prefecture on the south bank of the Kabura River.

Surrounding municipalities
Gunma Prefecture
 Fujioka
 Takasaki
 Tomioka
 Shimonita

Climate
Kanra has a Humid continental climate (Köppen Cfa) characterized by warm summers and cold winters with heavy snowfall.  The average annual temperature in Kanra is 12.8 °C. The average annual rainfall is 1166 mm with September as the wettest month. The temperatures are highest on average in August, at around 25.4 °C, and lowest in January, at around 1.1 °C.

Demographics
Per Japanese census data, the population of Kanra has remained relatively steady over the past 60 years.

History
During the Edo period, the center of present-day Kanra was the jōkamachi of Obata Domain, a feudal domain under the Tokugawa shogunate in Kōzuke Province.  Obata village, Akihata village, Fukushima town, and Niiya village were created within Kitakanra District of Gunma Prefecture on April 1, 1889 with the creation of the modern municipalities system after the Meiji Restoration. In 1925 Obata village was elevated in status into Obata town. In 1950 Kitakanra District was renamed Kanra District.  Akihata village merged with Obata in 1955, and Fukushima and Niiya villages were into Obata on February 1, 1959, creating Kanra town.

Government
Kanra has a mayor-council form of government with a directly elected mayor and a unicameral town council of 12 members. Kanra, together with the other municipalities in Kanra District contributes one member to the Gunma Prefectural Assembly. In terms of national politics, the town is part of Gunma 5th district of the lower house of the Diet of Japan.

Economy
The economy of Kanra is heavily dependent on agriculture.

Education
Kanra has three public elementary schools and three public middle schools operated by the town government. The town does not have a high school.

Transportation

Railway
 Jōshin Dentetsu - Jōshin Line
 -

Highway
  – Kanra PA

Sister city relations
 - Certaldo, Italy, friendship city since 1984

Local attractions
Rakusan-en gardens, National Place of Scenic Beauty.

References

External links

Official Website 

Towns in Gunma Prefecture
Kanra, Gunma